Choristoneura argentifasciata is a species of moth of the family Tortricidae. It is found in the United States, where it has been recorded from Florida, Georgia, Louisiana, Mississippi and Texas.

The length of the forewings is 6–7 mm for males and 7.4-8.2 mm for females. The forewings are orange with brown to dark brown scales bordering silver-white markings. The hindwings are brown with orange near the apex. Adults have been recorded on wing from March to August.

References

Moths described in 1989
Choristoneura